Emily Zacharias (born March 13, 2001) is a Canadian curler from Altona, Manitoba. She currently plays lead on Team Jennifer Jones. As a member of her sister Mackenzie Zacharias' team, she earned gold medals at both the 2020 Canadian Junior Curling Championships and the 2020 World Junior Curling Championships.

Career
Zacharias represented Manitoba at the 2016 U18 International Curling Championships where the rink won a gold medal, defeating the other undefeated team New Brunswick's Justine Comeau in the final. She also represented Manitoba the following year at the 2017 Canadian U18 Curling Championships where they finished with a 4–4 record.

Zacharias won her first Manitoba junior title in 2019. They had a fifth-place finish at the 2019 Canadian Junior Curling Championships. The following year, her and her sister Mackenzie Zacharias brought on Karlee Burgess and Lauren Lenentine to the team. They would win the Manitoba juniors once again and represent Manitoba at the national championship.  They would not have any loses at the 2020 Canadian Junior Curling Championships, completing a perfect 11–0 week by defeating Alberta's Abby Marks in the final. At the world junior championships, they defeated South Korea's Kim Min-ji to claim the gold medal.

Due to the COVID-19 pandemic in Canada, many provinces had to cancel their provincial championships, with member associations selecting their representatives for the 2021 Scotties Tournament of Hearts. Due to this situation, Curling Canada added three Wild Card teams to the national championship, which were based on the CTRS standings from the 2019–20 season. Because Team Zacharias ranked 11th on the CTRS and kept at least three of their four players together for the 2020–21 season, they got the second Wild Card spot at the 2021 Scotties in Calgary, Alberta. At the Hearts, they finished with a 3–5 round robin record, failing to qualify for the championship round.

Team Zacharias won their second event of the 2021–22 season, going undefeated to capture the Mother Club Fall Curling Classic. They later had a semifinal finish at the Stu Sells Toronto Tankard after losing to eventual winners Team Hollie Duncan. Because of their successes on tour, Team Zacharias had enough points to qualify for the 2021 Canadian Olympic Curling Pre-Trials. At the Pre-Trials, the team finished the round robin with a 4–2 record. This qualified them for the double knockout round, where they lost both of their games and were eliminated. Elsewhere on tour, the team reached the quarterfinals of the Red Deer Curling Classic and won the MCT Championships in November 2021. At the 2022 Manitoba Scotties Tournament of Hearts in December 2021, Team Zacharias finished with a 3–2 record in their pool, enough to advance to the championship pool. They then won three straight games to finish first overall and earn a bye to the provincial final. In the final, they faced the Kristy Watling rink which they defeated 7–5, earning the right to represent Manitoba at the 2022 Scotties Tournament of Hearts. At the Hearts, the team finished the round robin with a 5–3 record. This qualified them for a tiebreaker against the Northwest Territories' Kerry Galusha, which they lost 8–6 and were eliminated. Team Zacharias played in their first Grand Slam event at the 2022 Players' Championship. There, they posted a 2–3 record, missing the playoffs. They wrapped up their season at the 2022 Best of the West event where they lost in the semifinals to Corryn Brown.

On March 17, 2022, Team Zacharias announced that they would be joining forces with Jennifer Jones for the 2022–23 season. Jones would take over the team as skip, with the four Zacharias members each moving down one position in the lineup.

Personal life
Zacharias is currently a kinesiology student at the University of Manitoba. Her sister Mackenzie Zacharias is the third on her team and her father Sheldon is their coach.

Teams

References

External links

Living people
2001 births
Canadian women curlers
Curlers from Winnipeg
University of Manitoba alumni
People from Pembina Valley Region, Manitoba
21st-century Canadian women